Fairton is an unincorporated community and census-designated place (CDP) located within Fairfield Township, in Cumberland County, New Jersey, United States. It is part of the Vineland-Millville-Bridgeton Primary Metropolitan Statistical Area for statistical purposes. As of the 2010 United States Census, the CDP's population was 1,264.

History
This area was occupied historically by the Lenape and Nanticoke peoples, both part of the Algonquian languages family of the Atlantic coast. Their territory was encroached on by European-American settlers from colonial times.

The first industry in Fairfield was a mill, established by English settler Samuel Fithian. He owned part of the Grist Mill on Forke Creek before 1702. No information has been discovered on the other owners, but the shares were probably held in common. At some time before 1763, the owners moved the mill dam to near Clarks Pond Road. The mill was owned by David Clark from 1759 to 1843.

In the 1810s, a pork and beef business was the principal industry in this area. In the center of town was a busy public wharf, from which were shipped vegetables, fish and lumber to large city markets. Fairton was also active in the boat-building industry; between 1850 and 1897, its yards built three sloops.

In 1978, the indigenous peoples based in Cumberland County reorganized as the Nanticoke Lenni-Lenape Tribal Nation. Their cultural center is based in Fairton, and their tribal headquarters in Bridgeton. The tribe said that in 2016 they had 3,000 enrolled members, whose membership is based on documented descent from core families and blood quantum. The tribe has not obtained federal recognition. They contend that a state resolution recognized them, but in March 2016 a state court of New Jersey said that the state has not officially recognized any American Indian tribe in its territory and had no process to do so. Tribal members have lived for centuries in Cumberland and Salem counties in present-day New Jersey.

Geography
According to the United States Census Bureau, the CDP had a total area of 2.988 square miles (7.739 km2), including 2.860 square miles (7.407 km2) of land and 0.128 square mile (0.332 km2) of water (4.29%).

Demographics

Census 2010

Census 2000
As of the 2000 United States Census there were 2,253 people, 474 households, and 334 families residing in the CDP. The population density was 308.5/km2 (798.7/mi2). There were 511 housing units at an average density of 70.0/km2 (181.1/mi2). The racial makeup of the CDP was 61.43% White, 33.38% African American, 2.35% Native American, 1.20% Asian, 0.18% from other races, and 1.46% from two or more races. Hispanic or Latino of any race were 11.54% of the population.

There were 474 households, out of which 26.8% had children under the age of 18 living with them, 53.0% were married couples living together, 11.8% had a female householder with no husband present, and 29.5% were non-families. 24.9% of all households were made up of individuals, and 11.4% had someone living alone who was 65 years of age or older. The average household size was 2.46 and the average family size was 2.92.

In the CDP the population was spread out, with 11.5% under the age of 18, 9.0% from 18 to 24, 48.0% from 25 to 44, 23.3% from 45 to 64, and 8.3% who were 65 years of age or older. The median age was 36 years. For every 100 females, there were 265.7 males. For every 100 females age 18 and over, there were 313.9 males.

The median income for a household in the CDP was $37,962, and the median income for a family was $41,000. Males had a median income of $30,750 versus $25,326 for females. The per capita income for the CDP was $20,005. About 3.1% of families and 5.9% of the population were below the poverty line, including 4.6% of those under age 18 and none of those age 65 or over.

Notable people

People who were born in, residents of, or otherwise closely associated with Fairton include:
 Nathaniel Clark Burt (1825–1874), Presbyterian clergyman.
 John T. Nixon (1820–1889), represented New Jersey's 1st congressional district in the United States House of Representatives from 1859 to 1863.

References

Fairfield Township, Cumberland County, New Jersey
Census-designated places in Cumberland County, New Jersey